Bellamy is an unincorporated community in Vernon County, in the U.S. state of Missouri.

History
Bellamy was platted in 1882 by Thomas Bellamy, who gave the community his family name.  A post office called Bellamy was established in 1883, and remained in operation until 1907. A variant name was "Bellamy City".

References

Unincorporated communities in Vernon County, Missouri
Unincorporated communities in Missouri